Pasquale Squitieri (27 November 1938 – 18 February 2017) was an Italian film director and screenwriter.

Life and career 
Born in Naples, Squitieri graduated in law, then was briefly involved in stage, as author ("La battaglia") and even actor (directed by Francesco Rosi).  He made his film debut with Io e Dio, produced by Vittorio De Sica, and, after two Spaghetti Westerns he signed as William Redford, he focused on drama films centered on political and social issues. His film Il prefetto di ferro won the David di Donatello for Best Film in 1978. Li chiamarono... briganti!, a film about the brigand Carmine Crocco, was suspended from the cinemas and it is not available on the home video market. Squitieri was the partner of Claudia Cardinale since 1974.
His 1980 film Savage Breed was entered into the 12th Moscow International Film Festival.
Since 2003 he had been romantically linked to the actress and singer Ottavia Fusco, whom he had married in December 2013.

Selected filmography

Io e Dio (1969)
Vengeance Is a Dish Served Cold (1971)
Camorra (1972)
I guappi (1974)
The Climber (1975)
Il prefetto di ferro (1977)
Corleone (1978)
L'arma (1978)
Savage Breed (1980)
Claretta (1984)
The Repenter (1985)
Naso di cane (1986) (TV miniseries)
The Third Solution (1988)
Gli invisibili (1988)
Atto di dolore (1990)
Il colore dell'odio (1990)
Geografia della fame (1991)
Li chiamarono... briganti! (1999)
L'avvocato de Gregorio (2003)
Father (2011)

References

External links 
 

1938 births
2017 deaths
Film people from Naples
Italian film directors
Spaghetti Western directors